Salem is a city in Harrison County, West Virginia, United States. The population was 1,485 at the 2020 census. It is located at the junction of U.S. Route 50 and West Virginia Route 23; the North Bend Rail Trail passes through the city. Salem University is located in Salem.

Geography
Salem is located at  (39.283411, -80.562731), along Salem Fork, a tributary of Tenmile Creek, in western Harrison County

History

Salem was settled in the summer of 1790 — as "New Salem" — by forty Seventh Day Baptist families  from Shrewsbury, New Jersey. Notable settler family names included Lippincott, Maxson, Babcock, Plumer, Davis, and Fitz-Randolph. New Salem was formally chartered and made a town by legislative enactment of the Virginia Assembly on December 19, 1794, on land owned by Samuel Fitz Randolph. John Patterson, John Davis, Samuel Lippincott, James Davis, Zebulon Maxon, Benjamin Thorp, Thomas Clayton, William Davis, Jacob Davis, George Jackson and John Haymond were appointed its first trustees.

By the 1870s, the town was more frequently being called "Salem" than "New Salem", as the separation of West Virginia from Virginia in 1863 had diminished the need to distinguish it from the town named Salem near Roanoke. The US Postal Service made the change official in March 1884. Salem was incorporated by the state of West Virginia on 25 February 1905.

As late as 1870, Charles A. Burdick came to town as a Seventh Day Baptist missionary, feeling the need for an educational institution in the area, opened a school, though it operated for only two semesters. In 1888, the Eastern Seventh Day Baptist Association provided for the construction of the Salem Academy, which later became a college in 1890, existing to this day.

Salem has a history of large fires. The same full city block has burned down twice in the city's history. The north side of Main Street downtown burned once in 1901 and again on March 2, 2006.  The more recent fire burned the old city bank building, several store fronts, and several residences; five structures in all were damaged. The fire was determined to have been started by a hot water tank in an apartment. The fire departments' ability to put out the blaze was hampered by a limited city water supply; they were forced to draw water from the nearby creek.

The Salem College Administration Building and Salem Historic District are listed on the National Register of Historic Places.

Demographics

2010 census
As of the census of 2010, there were 1,586 people, 662 households, and 384 families living in the city. The racial makeup of the city was 93.5% White, 4.1% African American, 0.2% Native American, 0.1% Asian, 0.1% from other races, and 2.0% from two or more races. Hispanic or Latino of any race were 1.1% of the population.

There were 662 households, of which 27.2% had children under the age of 18 living with them, 36.4% were married couples living together, 15.3% had a female householder with no husband present, 6.3% had a male householder with no wife present, and 42.0% were non-families. 35.3% of all households were made up of individuals, and 13.6% had someone living alone who was 65 years of age or older. The average household size was 2.23 and the average family size was 2.88.

The median age in the city was 36.1 years. 20.5% of residents were under the age of 18; 15.8% were between the ages of 18 and 24; 23.1% were from 25 to 44; 26.3% were from 45 to 64; and 14.4% were 65 years of age or older. The gender makeup of the city was 49.1% male and 50.9% female.

2000 census
As of the census of 2000, there were 2,006 people, 744 households, and 412 families living in the city. The population density was 1,451.0 people per square mile (561.2/km2). There were 858 housing units at an average density of 620.6 per square mile (240.1/km2). The racial makeup of the city was 87.39% White, 2.34% African American, 0.20% Native American, 7.93% Asian, 0.05% Pacific Islander, 0.75% from other races, and 1.35% from two or more races. Hispanic or Latino of any race were 1.00% of the population.

There were 744 households, out of which 26.5% had children under the age of 18 living with them, 37.6% were married couples living together, 14.0% had a female householder with no husband present, and 44.5% were non-families. 36.7% of all households were made up of individuals, and 15.9% had someone living alone who was 65 years of age or older. The average household size was 2.21 and the average family size was 2.92.

In the city, the population was spread out, with 18.3% under the age of 18, 25.2% from 18 to 24, 21.0% from 25 to 44, 18.3% from 45 to 64, and 17.1% who were 65 years of age or older. The median age was 31 years. For every 100 females, there were 99.4 males. For every 100 females age 18 and over, there were 105.0 males.

The median income for a household in the city was $16,577, and the median income for a family was $27,688. Males had a median income of $27,031 versus $16,667 for females. The per capita income for the city was $11,188. About 26.7% of families and 34.8% of the population were below the poverty line, including 40.6% of those under age 18 and 14.7% of those age 65 or over.

Education 

Salem University is a private university in the city, founded in 1888 by Seventh Day Baptists. The Salem College Administration Building was completed in 1910 and listed on the National Register of Historic Places in 1989.

Notable people
 Jennings Randolph: US Senator for West Virginia (1958–1985)
 Melvin Mayfield:  US Army soldier and a recipient of the US military's highest decoration — the Medal of Honor — for his actions in World War II

References

Cities in West Virginia
Cities in Harrison County, West Virginia
Northwestern Turnpike
Clarksburg micropolitan area
Populated places established in 1790
1790 establishments in Virginia